White Ghost Shivers is an eclectic American band based in Austin, Texas which claims  cabaret, jazz, vaudeville, hokum, western swing, hillbilly, jugband and ragtime as its inspiration.   The band has been declared "Best None of the Above" by the Austin Music Awards for 2005 and 2007.

Band members
Shorty Stump: vocals, tenor banjo, ukuleles, guitar, mandolin, kazoo, nose flute, tuba, jug
Cella Blue: vocals, skirt-lifting, slide whistle, various sound effects, mover and shaker
Smokebreak Slemenda/Detective Stain: vocals, lead guitar
Hot Thomas/Sleepytime T: vocals, violin, tenor banjo
Poppiticus/Ma poppitt: string bass, background vocals
Ten-Penny Brown/Saturn: clarinet, tenor saxophone, jug
Reese's Pieces/Baby-Faced Finster: stride piano, saw, uke

Discography
Hokum If You Gottem (2003; Chicken Ranch Records)
White Ghost Shivers Ball (3:17)
Tell It to Me (2:56)
Too Damn Old (2:19)
Delores (4:07)
Down and Out Rag (2:31)
This Ol' Life (3:14)
Siberian Cakewalk (4:00)
Outhouse Blues (4:06)
Ignacio (4:13)
My Gal (3:26)
Who Walks In (3:18)
Eliza May (5:12)
One Eyed Sam (4:04)
Sweet the Monkey (4:18)
Big Horn Blues (7:44)
Shouldn't Do That (Bonus Track on 2005 Reissue; 3:01)
Shopping Mall (Bonus Track on 2005 Reissue; 2:27)
Live on the Radio (2005)
Pipe Dreams
Tell It To Me
The Ghost Song
Chinatown
Outhouse Blues
Oh Malloy
Devil With The Devil
Sweet The Monkey
Big N Easy
Delores
One Eyed Sam
White Ghost Shivers Ball
Everyone's Got 'Em (2006)
Everyone's Got' em
Mama said
Little Kisses
Weed Smokers Dream
Slaughter the Hog
The Ghost Song
Chinatown
My Land
Strictly Ornamental
Shivers' Stomp
Oh! Malloy
Toot Yer Whistle, Blow My Horn
Pipe Dreams
Made for Two
Nobody Loves You Like We Do (2011)
White Trash Fast Food
Nobody Love You
Too Easy
Some Things A Girl Can't Give Away
Sweet The Monkey
Sweet Banana
Short Haired Girl
Murder In The Big Top
Sun Stare
Daddy Won't You Please Come Home
The Reaper
Maybe Mary Might Marry Me
We Never Mention Aunt Clara

References

External links
White Ghost Shivers official site
https://www.facebook.com/whiteghostshivers
Review of Everyone's Got 'Em at WhatzUp Magazine

Musical groups from Austin, Texas
Musical groups established in 2000
2000 establishments in Texas